Inez Jesse Baskin (June 18, 1916 – June 28, 2007) was an American journalist and civil rights supporter who covered the Civil Rights Movement and the Montgomery bus boycott for African American readers and publications.

Biography 
Baskin was born in Florala, Alabama, on June 18, 1916, to Cora Turner and Albert Lorenzo Turner.

When Baskin was two years old, she and her parents moved to Montgomery, Alabama. Florala, Alabama became too unsafe to reside in because of the Ku Klux Klan. There, she attended Booker T. Washington High School.

She married Wilbur Baskin in the Baptist Church. 

After positions as a teacher and a typist, she became a journalist and reporter for the "Negro News" section of the Montgomery Adviser newspaper. In 1955, following the arrest of Rosa Parks, Baskin was hired by Jet Magazine and the American Negro Press to cover the Montgomery bus boycott and other, lesser known events that occurred in the black community. 

Baskin was an active supporter of the bus boycott and the Civil Rights Movement, as well as a reporter of the event. She is most famous for riding one seat  in front of Martin Luther King Jr. on a Montgomery bus during the boycott.

Baskin was known to support suffrage, having been photographed in a convertible, with a sign that declared her support for Young Alabama Democrats, and said that she was a registered voter.

Baskin graduated from what is now Alabama State University with an education degree. She received a degree in divinity from Selma University, and taught classes to ministers in theological schools.

She was a licensed social worker and a church pianist. She implemented Montgomery, Alabama's first Head Start program, as well as its first hot-lunch program for low-income children.

Towards the end of her life, Baskin was passionate about teaching young children about racism, and influencing them to grow up without hatred. She believed that hatred was taught, and that no one was born with it. She spoke to groups of children across the country about her experience in the Civil Rights Movement. Baskin continued to write until her death, writing her own quarterly newspaper, "The Monitor."

Baskin gave a keynote address at Edinboro University in Pennsylvania, in 2007. The same year, the university established a scholarship in her name, called the "Willie Mae Goodwine and Inez J. Baskin Scholarship of Journalism".

She died in Montgomery, Alabama, of heart failure, on June 28, 2007.

References

Further reading 
Rabey, Jennifer (2009). A Woman's Good Works: The Life of Inez Jessie Turner Baskin and Her Fight for Civil and Human Rights in the Cradle of the Confederacy. Thesis, Auburn University.

External links
Four photographs of Inez Jesse Turner Baskin as a child in Florala, Alabama
Inez Baskin Papers

Activists for African-American civil rights
1916 births
2007 deaths
Writers from Montgomery, Alabama
Journalists from Alabama
20th-century American journalists